The Moldova women's national rugby sevens team represents Moldova in women's rugby sevens. They won the FIRA–AER Women's Sevens - Division A in 2010. In 2019 they won the Rugby Europe Women's Sevens Conference and, were promoted to the Trophy division and qualified for the Europe Women's Sevens Olympic Qualifying Tournament in Russia.

Moldova finished last at the 2021 Rugby Europe Women's Sevens Trophy in Zagreb, Croatia.

Players

Previous squads

Cristina Popescu
Parascovia Chirita
Irina Tintari
Lilia Bunici
Oxana Bunici
Adriana Revenco 
Maria Ursu 
Elena Covali 
Anastasia Mosneagu 
Oxana Budean 
Mihaela Artic 
Marina Vladimirov

References

External links
 Moldovan Rugby Federation Official Site

Women's national rugby sevens teams
Rugby union in Moldova